Roman Alexandrovich Kutuzov (born July 23, 1986 in Moscow) is a Russian curler.

At the national level, he is a two-time Russian men's champion curler (2010, 2011) and a two-time Russian mixed champion (2009, 2012).

Teams

Men's

Mixed

Mixed doubles

References

External links

Реестр Тренеров - Кутузов Роман Александрович - Mos.ru
Роман Кутузов: фото, биография, фильмография, новости - Вокруг ТВ

Video: 

Living people
1986 births
Curlers from Moscow
Sportspeople from Krasnodar Krai
Russian male curlers
Russian curling champions